The Tagol Murut language is spoken by the Tagol (lowland) subgroup of the Murut people, and serves as the lingua franca of the whole group. It belongs to the Bornean subdivision of the Austronesian language family. Tagol Murut people can be found in Sabah and Sarawak, usually in areas around Sipitang, Tenom, Lawas, Limbang, and along the border areas shared with Brunei and Indonesia.

References

Murutic languages
Endangered Austronesian languages
Languages of Malaysia
Languages of Indonesia